The 1944 Soviet Cup was an association football cup competition of the Soviet Union.

Competition schedule

First round
 [Jul 30] 
 CDKA Moskva                  5-0  Traktor Stalingrad 
   [Pyotr Shcherbatenko-2, Vladimir Dyomin, Dyachenko, ?] 
 DINAMO Baku                  5-1  Zenit Taganrog           [in Rostov-na-Donu] 
 DINAMO Tbilisi               w/o  Dinamo Yerevan 
 Krylya Sovetov Kuibyshev     1-5  LOKOMOTIV Moskva 
 Stakhanovets Stalino         1-5  DINAMO-2 Moskva 
   [Vasiliy Bryushin 33- Konstantin Balyasov 18, ??...] 
 ZENIT Leningrad              3-1  Dinamo Moskva 
   [Viktor Bodrov 20 pen, Alexei Yablochkin 63, Boris Levin-Kogan 75 – Konstantin Beskov 86] 
 [Aug 2] 
 Traktor Chelyabinsk          4-6  DKA Novosibirsk 
 Zenit Sverdlovsk             2-11 DINAMO Leningrad

Second round
 [Aug 6] 
 CDKA Moskva                  5-0  Lokomotiv Moskva 
   [Vladimir Dyomin, Valentin Nikolayev, Dyachenko, Pyotr Shcherbatenko, Alexei Grinin] 
 DINAMO Baku                  2-1  Dinamo Tbilisi 
   [Artash Amirjanov 34, Korolyov 50 – Gayoz jejelava 75] 
 Dinamo Ivanovo               0-6  KRYLYA SOVETOV Moskva 
 Dinamo Kiev                  1-2  SPARTAK Moskva           [aet] 
   [Konstantin Kalach 61 – Nikolai Klimov 18, 117] 
 DINAMO Leningrad             5-1  DKA Novosibirsk          [in Chelyabinsk]  
 Dinamo-2 Moskva              0-0  Zenit Leningrad 
 Lokomotiv Kharkov            2-3  AVIAUCHILISHCHE Moskva 
   [Valentin Putsenko, Boris Gurkin – Nikolai Tsutskov-2, Alexandr Striganov pen] 
 Torpedo Gorkiy               2-3  TORPEDO Moskva 
   [Vasiliy Panfilov, Alexei Salakov – A.Ryomin, Anton Yakovlev, Georgiy Zharkov]

Second round replays
 [Aug 7] 
 Dinamo-2 Moskva              0-1  ZENIT Leningrad 
   [Alexei Larionov 39]

Quarterfinals
 [Aug 13] 
 Dinamo Leningrad             1-4  CDKA Moskva 
   [Oleg Oshenkov – Valentin Nikolayev-3, Grigoriy Fedotov] 
 SPARTAK Moskva               1-0  AviaUchilishche Moskva 
   [Alexei Sokolov 49] 
 TORPEDO Moskva               2-1  Krylya Sovetov Moskva 
   [Vasiliy Zharkov 15, Anton Yakovlev 27 – Alexandr Sevidov 82] 
 ZENIT Leningrad              1-0  Dinamo Baku 
   [Sergei Salnikov 55]

Semifinals
 [Aug 20] 
 CDKA Moskva                  3-2  Torpedo Moskva 
   [Grigoriy Fedotov 12, Pyotr Shcherbatenko 22, Alexei Grinin 55 – Alexandr Ponomaryov 4, 75] 
 [Aug 22] 
 Spartak Moskva               2-2  Zenit Leningrad 
   [Nikolai Klimov 68, Georgiy Glazkov 72 – Sergei Salnikov 65, Nikolai Smirnov 78]

Semifinals replays
 [Aug 23] 
 Spartak Moskva               0-1  ZENIT Leningrad          [aet]
   [Boris Chuchelov 97]

Final

External links
 Complete calendar. helmsoccer.narod.ru
 1944 Soviet Cup. Footballfacts.ru
 1944 Soviet football season. RSSSF

Soviet Cup seasons
Cup
Soviet Cup
Soviet Cup